Action 3D is a 2013 Indian Telugu-language 3D comedy film directed by Anil Sunkara, starring an ensemble cast of Allari Naresh, Shaam, Vaibhav, and Raju Sundaram. The film was released on 21 June 2013. The film is based on The Hangover (2009).

Cast

Allari Naresh as Bala Vardhan "Bava"
Shaam as Ajay
Vaibhav as Shiva
Raju Sundaram as Purushottam "Purush"
Neelam Upadhyaya as Geetha
Sneha Ullal as Sameera
Kamna Jethmalani as Anitha
Ritu Barmecha as Sandhya
Sheena Shahabadi as Shruthi
Brahmanandam as Magnet Mama
M. S. Narayana as Bokka Babu
Ali as ATM Jackson
Sunil as an actor
Posani Krishna Murali as a director
Krishna Bhagawan
Master Bharath
Shankar Melkote
Sudipto Balav
Jhansi
Prudhvi Raj
Sudeepa in a guest appearance

Production
Anil Sunkara, making his directorial debut after the success of his production venture Dookudu, signed on Allari Naresh to play the lead role in a comedy 3D film in November 2011. In March 2012, the cast was finalised with Shaam, Raju Sundaram and Vaibhav Reddy. Kamna Jethmalani, Neelam Upadhyaya and Sneha Ullal were also selected to play leading female roles in the film. Bappa Lahiri, son of Bappi Lahiri, was signed on to compose the film's songs while Sunny M.R.  composed the film's background score. The film will be shot in 3D with the Red One camera system by Sarvesh Murari, with technicians brought in from the US to guide production.  Sunil and Posani Krishna Murali made guest appearances.  Kannada actor Sudeepa, who starred in Eega (2012) made a special appearance in the Telugu version while Silambarasan made a guest appearance in the Tamil version.

The Tamil version of the film was titled as Aasu Raja Rani Jackie Matrum Joker and the Telugu version was titled as Action, with both versions being launched at Karnataka School located in T Nagar, Chennai on 22 March 2012, with Tamil Nadu Governor K. Rosaiah gracing the event as chief guest. The film is expected to be shot across the US and Thailand. The film's filming and post-production activities were wrapped up on 8 June 2013 and a function was held in regard of this fact. However, apart from Multiplexes and A Centers, the film is releasing in 3D even in C Centers using Anaglyph 3D technology to overcome poor infrastructure in C centers for which special glasses were imported from China. After getting feedback from the audience on the day of release, 15 minutes of film were edited out of the second half.

Reception
A critic from The Times of India gave the film a rating of two-and-a-half out of five stars and stated that " The movie does pack a few gags, but there’s plenty that can make you cringe as well. Watch it purely to get a taste of the extra dimension". A critic from The Hindu wrote that "Watch this only if your idea of having fun is watching crude humour on 3D". A critic fromOneindia Entertainment gave a review of rating 3/5 stating "Watch it for the fun of it. Enjoy a 3D Telugu film with good enough acting, Action 3D".

The film's poor performance at the box office meant that the Tamil version, Aasu Raja Rani Jackie Matrum Joker, did not have a release.

Soundtrack

Bappi Lahari and his son Bappa Lahari composed the songs for this film. The audio was launched on 22 April 2013 at Prasads Multiplex in Hyderabad.

References

External links
 Official page
 

2013 films
Indian remakes of American films
2010s Telugu-language films
Indian 3D films
2013 3D films